Events from the year 1458 in England.

Incumbents
 Monarch – Henry VI
 Lord Chancellor – William Waynflete
 Lord Privy Seal – Lawrence Booth

Events
 25 March – The Love Day is staged in London, by which Henry VI of England attempts to unite the warring factions who have triggered the War of the Roses
 15 July – foundation of Magdalen College, Oxford.
 May – Richard Neville, 16th Earl of Warwick defeats a Spanish fleet in the English Channel.

Births
 Richard Grey, half brother of Edward V of England (died 1483)
 Thomas Docwra, Grand Prior of the English Knights Hospitaller (died 1527)
 Catherine Woodville, Duchess of Buckingham, noblewoman (died 1497)

Deaths
 Thomas Gascoigne, theologian (born 1404)
 Thomas de Courtenay, Earl of Devon, nobleman (born 1414)
 Humphrey Stafford, Earl of Stafford, nobleman (born 1425)
 John Shillingford, politician (unknown year of birth)
 Thomas Rempston, soldier (unknown year of birth)

 
Years of the 15th century in England